Paul Löwinger (10 November 1904 – 17 December 1988) was an Austrian actor, theatre manager and writer.
While still a child, he performed on his parents' stage, the Löwinger Bühne. In 1938 they were probably the first theatre ensemble which performed in front of television cameras. The same year he married Liesl Meinhard. The couple had three children: Guggi Löwinger, Sissy Löwinger and Paul Löwinger. He took over the Löwinger Bühne in 1947. Löwinger wrote numerous comedies and well known plays. His plays were often broadcast on television. He also took part in numerous German and Austrian films, such as "Zyankali" (1947) or "Kaiserball" (1956) and became internationally popular.  His daughter Sissy managed the family-owned theatre until her death on 25 September 2011. Löwinger was buried (like his wife) at the Wiener Zentralfriedhof.

Selected filmography
 His Daughter is Called Peter (1936)
 Royal Hunt in Ischl (1955)
 Emperor's Ball (1956)
 The Beautiful Master (1956)
 My Father, the Ape and I (1971)

External links 
Paul Löwinger at IMDB
Scene Löwinger Bühne (Sissy with Paul Löwinger)
Paul Löwinger at aeiou.
Paul Löwinger at austria-forum

1904 births
1988 deaths
Austrian male child actors
Austrian male film actors
Austrian male stage actors
20th-century Austrian male actors